Ashland is a town in Hanover County, Virginia, United States, located  north of Richmond along Interstate 95 and U.S. Route 1. As of the 2010 census it had a population of 7,225, up from 6,619 at the 2000 census.

Ashland is named after the Lexington, Kentucky estate of Hanover County native and statesman Henry Clay. It is the only incorporated town in Hanover County.

History
The Richmond, Fredericksburg and Potomac Railroad initially developed the town in the 1840s as a mineral springs resort with a racetrack. The town was named "Ashland" after native son Henry Clay's estate in Kentucky and was officially incorporated on February 19, 1858. The area had been known as "The Slashes", sometimes translated as "swamp", but which also reflected the small ravines that formed in the sandy clay soil after hard rains.

Confederate troops trained on the former racetrack early in the American Civil War, but the war and its aftermath devastated Ashland. Randolph–Macon College (founded 1830) moved to Ashland in 1868 and began using buildings of the bankrupt hotel as well as building additional structures.

The railroad lines rebuilt and the town continued to expand. Even before the war, the railroad began offering monthly passes to Richmond to people buying lots and building houses in Ashland. When tycoon Jay Gould established an electrified interurban line between Ashland and Richmond in 1907, the town became an early streetcar suburb of Richmond. The Richmond and Chesapeake Bay Railway, as it came to be called, was abandoned in 1938. A former car barn in Ashland is one of the few remaining vestiges of the line.

Construction of U.S. Route 1 on the former Washington (or Richmond) Road, and later I-95, further shaped the town character and development.

Ashland itself originally had a Free Church, shared by various Protestant denominations. Several denominations built churches shortly after the Civil War, but many have been torn down. The town's current Episcopal church is St. James the Less, on the other side of the railway line from Slash Church and whose congregation received monthly clergy visitations in the 1850s, and which in 1958 sold its 1866-consecrated and once-moved building as well as the old rectory (which still remains today, in private ownership) in order to build a larger one on the town's outskirts. The Disciples of Christ also had a historic church on Center Street (built 1900) that was replaced in 1985. Historic churches still within the town's (and historic district's) boundaries include Ashland Baptist Church (1860, now the Hanover Arts and Activities Center); Shiloh Baptist Church (1866, originally Freedmens Baptist Church), Duncan Memorial Chapel (Methodist, 1879), St. Ann's Catholic Church (built 1892, remodeled 1925) and Ashland Presbyterian Church (1875-1881). Gwathmey Baptist Church (1892) is a mile nearer Richmond and (like the former St. James the Less Church), within 50 feet of the railroad tracks. The town now also has an Eastern Orthodox congregation, St. Andrew's (2001), and a messianic Jewish congregation (Beth Shalom Ministries, 2004).
 
On October 19, 2002, Ashland made national news as the site of one of the D.C. sniper attacks. 37-year-old Jeffrey Hopper was shot at 8:00 pm in the parking lot of a Ponderosa Steakhouse as he and his wife left the restaurant. A ransom demand note the snipers left nearby was instrumental in identifying them.

The local newspaper, The Herald-Progress, published its final edition on March 29, 2018.

Geography
Ashland is located near the center of Hanover County at  (37.759361, −77.477226). U.S. Route 1 passes through the east side of the center of town, leading north  to Doswell and south  to Richmond. Interstate 95 passes through the town limits further to the east, with access from Exit 92. Virginia State Route 54 goes through the center of Ashland as England Street and Thompson Street, leading east  to U.S. Route 301 at Hanover, the county seat, and northwest  to Montpelier.

Ashland is drained to the north by tributaries of the South Anna River, part of the Pamunkey and York River watershed, and to the south by tributaries of the Chickahominy River, part of the James River watershed.

Climate
The climate in this area is humid subtropical (Cfa) and is characterized by hot, humid summers and generally mild to cold winters. Average monthly temperatures range from 36.4 °F in January to 77.4 °F in July.  The hardiness zone is 7a.

Demographics

As of the census of 2010, there were 7225 people with 2,863 households in the town. The racial makeup of the town was 71.1% White, 22.2% African American, 0.4% Native American, 1.2% Asian, 0.68% from other races, and 2.6% from two or more races. Hispanic or Latino of any race were 4.7% of the population.

The median income for a household in the town was $46,474. The per capita income for the town was $23,569. About 5.9% of the population were below the poverty line.

Public services
Ashland is governed by a five-member town council, and day-to-day activities are run by a town manager, appointed by the town council. Hanover County handles stormwater pollutant removal and filtration. The town's library is part of the multi-county Pamunkey Regional Library System, although additional libraries are at the courthouse and Randolph Macon College.

The Ashland Volunteer Fire Company, formed in 1890, is located on 501 Archie Canon Drive. The Ashland Police Department has 25 sworn full-time officers and is Law Enforcement Accredited by the Commission on Accreditation for Law Enforcement Agencies, Inc. (CALEA).

Transportation
Ashland's major highway connection is to I-95 at exit 92, via Virginia State Route 54.

Ashland's railroad station is served by Amtrak Northeast Regional trains  bound for Richmond, Newport News and Norfolk, as well as points north such as Washington, D.C., and beyond on the Northeast Corridor to Baltimore, Philadelphia, New York City, and Boston. Other Amtrak long-distance trains, such as the Silver Meteor and Auto Train to Florida, pass through Ashland without stopping on the CSX railroad's double-track mainline that bisects the downtown business district. As those trains approach Ashland, onboard announcers point out the Randolph–Macon College campus and the houses and businesses facing the tracks.

Proposals in the 2016 "DC2RVA" study to improve rail service between Washington, D.C., and Richmond by expanding the existing double-track railroad to triple-track have prompted concerns about its impact on the prized ambiance of downtown Ashland. The Main Street merchants' association said at a hearing that the additional track would result in "incalculable” loss to the city's "charm, the quaintness, and the aesthetic values".

Local attractions and events
Ashland's tourist information center is located at the Ashland railroad station. Bloomberg Business in 2009 named Ashland "Best Place to Raise your Kids" in Virginia. In 2014, Movoto.com named Ashland one of America's 10 best small towns.

Pufferbelly Park, located behind the Ashland Police Department, features playground facilities and the town's public skatepark, which opened in 2004.

For nearly 35 years, Ashland's main festival has been the "Strawberry Faire" in June, at which vendors from around the state sell a variety of different items (with a strawberry theme). Festivities include a Strawberry Faire Pageant for Little Miss and Mister Strawberry, as well as live performances by local artists. Ten Hanover County Schools students each year receive Strawberry Faire scholarships.

The "Ashland Musical Variety Show" is a biennial talent show held in odd years. It features songs and skits performed by area residents and raises funds for the Hanover Arts & Activities Center in Ashland. It started in 1982.

Another festival is the family-friendly annual "Ashland Train Day" on the last Saturday in April. Vendors can be found from around the country up and down Railroad Avenue. With the Quiet Zone rules in suspension, visitors are treated to frequent CSX freight trains and Amtrak passenger trains sounding off.

In popular culture
Scenes from the 1995 film Major Payne were shot at Ashland's railroad station.

See also
 Ashland Skate Park

References

External links

 Town of Ashland official website
 Ashland Volunteer Fire Company
 Hanover County Economic Development

Towns in Hanover County, Virginia
1858 establishments in Virginia
Populated places established in 1858
Towns in Virginia
Suburbs of Richmond, Virginia